This is a list of seasons played by Leicester City Football Club in English and European football, from 1890 (when Leicester Fosse first competed in the FA Cup) to the present day. It details the club's achievements in major competitions, and the top scorers for each season.

In 2016, Leicester City clinched their first Premier League title, their highest position in the League. Their lowest position was in 2009, when they clinched the League One (third tier) title, their only season outside the top two tiers of English football.

Seasons

Overall
Seasons spent at Level 1 of the football league system: 55
Seasons spent at Level 2 of the football league system: 62
Seasons spent at Level 3 of the football league system: 1
Seasons spent at Level 4 of the football league system: 0

Key 

Div 1 = Football League First Division
Div 2 = Football League Second Division
Prem = Premier League
Champ = Football League Championship
Lge 1 = Football League One
N/A = Not applicable
Pld = Matches played
W = Matches won
D = Matches drawn
L = Matches lost
GF = Goals for
GA = Goals against
Pts = Points won
Pos = Final position
1Q = First qualifying round
2Q = First qualifying round
3Q = Third qualifying round
4Q = Fourth qualifying round
5Q = Fifth qualifying round
PO = Play-off round
INT = Intermediate round
NRU = Northern area runners-up
PR = Preliminary round
GS = Group stage
R1 = Round 1
R2 = Round 2
R3 = Round 3
R4 = Round 4
R5 = Round 5
QF = Quarter-finals 
SF = Semi-finals
R/U = Runners-up
W = Winners

Note: Bold text indicates a competition won.
''Note 2: Where fields are left blank, the club did not participate in a competition that season.

Notes

References

External links 
Leicester Fosse
Leicester City

Seasons
 
Leicester City
football